is an art museum located in the .

History 

Collection 
The museum maintains a permanent collection consisting primarily of Japanese paintings, as well as a large collection of ceramics by Itaya Hazan, and East Asian ceramics. It holds several temporary exhibitions each year.

See also
List of National Treasures of Japan (paintings)

External links
 Idemitsu Museum of Arts 

1966 establishments in Japan
Art museums and galleries in Tokyo
Art museums established in 1966
Museums in Fukuoka Prefecture
Buildings and structures in Kitakyushu
Ceramics museums in Japan